"Bang Bang" is a song by French singer Lartiste, released on May 22, 2015 as him studio album Fenómeno.

Music video
As of November 2022, the music video for Bang Bang had over 25 million views on YouTube.

Charts

References

2015 songs
2015 singles